Tower Power was the 1994 game for the FIRST Robotics Competition.

Field

The surface consists of a closed loop, low piled carpet. The perimeter of the field was defined by four-by-four boards. At the beginning of a match, there were 36 soccer balls (12 of each color: red, white or blue) arranged into 6 piles of 6 identical balls each. Each team was assigned a color and must collect only balls of their color during the game.

Robots
The robots used six motors which were powered by a MAW 23 volt battery.

Scoring
In each match, the three teams competed to place the 12 balls of their team color inside either the high goal, worth 3 points per ball, or the low goal, worth one point per ball. The winner was the team that had the highest total point value of soccer balls within the two goals at the end of the 2 minute match. In the case of a tie, the team with more balls in the upper goal won.

References

External links

1994 in robotics
FIRST Robotics Competition games